Blazor is a free and open-source web framework that enables developers to create web apps using C# and HTML. It is being developed by Microsoft.

Overview
Six different editions of Blazor apps have been announced.

Blazor Server: These apps are hosted on an ASP.NET Core server in ASP.NET Razor format. Remote clients act as thin clients, meaning that the bulk of the processing load is on the server. The client's web browser downloads a small page and updates its UI over a SignalR connection. Blazor Server was released as a part of .NET Core 3.

Blazor WebAssembly: Single-page apps that are downloaded to the client's web browser before running. The size of the download is larger than for Blazor Server, depends on the app, and the processing is entirely done on the client hardware. However, this app type enjoys rapid response time. As its name suggests, this client-side framework is written in WebAssembly, as opposed to JavaScript (while they can be used together).

Blazor PWA and Blazor Hybrid editions: The former supports progressive web apps (PWA). The latter is a platform-native framework (as opposed to a web framework) but still renders the user interface using web technologies (e.g. HTML and CSS). 

Blazor Native: A platform-native framework that renders a platform-native user interface – has also been considered but has not reached the planning stage.

Blazor United: These apps will be a combination of both Blazor Server and Blazor WebAssembly and allow a "best of both worlds" solution where developers would be able to more finely tune the rendering mode.  This approach would overcome the shortcomings of the potentially large up-front download that Blazor WebAssembly requires and the constantly open SignalR connection that Blazor Server requires.  This version of Blazor is currently part of the .NET 8 roadmap and has not yet been released.  

Despite the confusion that the descriptions of ASP.NET and Blazor could generate, the latter focuses on the creation of web applications with the aim of using the C# programming language instead of the JavaScript language, which is commonly used in this type of application.

With the release of .NET 5, Blazor has stopped working on Internet Explorer and the legacy version of Microsoft Edge.

Example
The following example shows how to implement a simple counter that can be incremented by clicking a button:

<h1>Blazor code example</h1>
<p>count: @count</p>
<button class="btn btn-primary" @onclick="IncCount">Click to increment</button>

@code {
    private int count = 0;

    private void IncCount()
    {
        count++;
    }
}

See also

asm.js – precursor of WebAssembly enabling client-side web apps written in C or C++
Google Native Client – deprecated Google's precursor to WebAssembly that enables running native code in a web browser, independent of browser's operating system

References

Further reading

External links
 
 
Blazor School - The Blazor community documentation.
Blazor University—Blazor documentation from a secondary, independent source

ASP.NET
Computer-related introductions in 2018
Cross-platform software
Microsoft application programming interfaces
Microsoft development tools
Software using the Apache license
Web programming